Rhoptropus is a genus of geckos endemic to Southern Africa, better known as Namib day geckos.

Classification of genus Rhoptropus
The following species are recognized:

Rhoptropus afer W. Peters, 1869 — Namib day gecko 
Rhoptropus barnardi Hewitt, 1926 — Barnard's Namib day gecko 
Rhoptropus benguellensis Mertens, 1938 — Benguela day gecko
Rhoptropus biporosus V. FitzSimons, 1957 
Rhoptropus boultoni K.P. Schmidt, 1933 — Boulton's Namib day gecko 
Rhoptropus bradfieldi Hewitt, 1935 
Rhoptropus diporus Haacke, 1965 
Rhoptropus montanus Laurent, 1964 — mountain day gecko
Rhoptropus taeniostictus Laurent, 1964

References

Further reading
Bauer AE, Good DA (1996). "Phylogenetic systematics of the day geckos, genus, Rhoptropus (Reptilia: Gekkonidae), of south-western Africa". Journal of Zoology 238 (4): 635–663.
Boulenger GA (1885). Catalogue of the Lizards in the British Museum (Natural History). Volume I. Geckonidæ ... London: Trustees of the British Museum (Natural History). (Taylor and Francis, printers). xii + 436 pp. + Plates I-XXXII. (Genus Rhoptropus, p. 217).
Branch, Bill (2004). Field Guide to Snakes and Other Reptiles of Southern Africa. Third Revised edition. Second impression. Sanibel Island, Florida: Ralph Curtis Books. 399 pp. . (Genus Rhoptropus, p. 266).    
Peters W (1869). "Eine Mittheilung über neue Gattungen und Arten von Eidechsen ". Monatsberichte der Königlich Preussischen Akademie der Wissenschaften zu Berlin 1869: 57–66 + one plate. (Rhoptropus, new genus, p. 58). (in Latin and German).
Schneider C, Barts M (2014). "Die Geckos der Gattung Rhoptropus". Sauria 36 (3): 29–39. (in German).

 
Lizard genera
Taxa named by Wilhelm Peters